The 2017 Open Championship was a major golf championship and the 146th Open Championship, held 20–23 July at Royal Birkdale Golf Club in Southport, England. It was the tenth Open Championship at Royal Birkdale, which held its first in 1954.

Jordan Spieth shot four rounds in the sixties for 268 (–12), three strokes ahead of runner-up Matt Kuchar, for his third major title, and the second in which he led wire-to-wire (2015 Masters). In the third round, Branden Grace scored 62 to set a new major championship record.

This was the first year that the prize money was paid in U.S. dollars, rather than British pounds.

Media
This was the second Open Championship televised domestically by Sky Sports. In the United States, it is the second Open Championship to be televised by NBC (Golf Channel's parent network).

Venue

This was the tenth Open Championship at Royal Birkdale; the ninth in 2008 saw Pádraig Harrington successfully defend his 2007 title from Carnoustie.

Course layout

Lengths of the course for previous Opens:
 2008: , par 70
 1998: , par 70
 1991: , par 70
 1983: , par 71  
 1976: , par 72
 1971: , par 73
 1965: , par 73
 1961: , par 72
 1954: , par 73

Field
The Open Championship field was made up of 156 players, who gained entry through various exemption criteria and qualifying tournaments. The criteria included past Open champions, recent major winners, top ranked players in the world rankings and from the leading world tours, and winners and high finishers from various designated tournaments, including the Open Qualifying Series; the winners of designated amateur events, including The Amateur Championship and U.S. Amateur, also gained exemption provided they remain an amateur. Anyone not qualifying via exemption, and had a handicap of 0.4 or lower, could gain entry through regional and final qualifying events.

Criteria and exemptions
Each player is classified according to the first category in which he qualified, but other categories are shown in parentheses.

1. The Open Champions aged 60 or under on 23 July 2017 

Stewart Cink (2)
Darren Clarke (2)
John Daly
David Duval
Ernie Els (2)
Todd Hamilton
Pádraig Harrington (2)
Zach Johnson (2,17)
Paul Lawrie
Tom Lehman
Sandy Lyle
Rory McIlroy (2,3,4,5,10,12,17)
Phil Mickelson (2,3,4,12,17)
Mark O'Meara
Louis Oosthuizen (2,4,5)
Henrik Stenson (2,3,4,5,17)

Eligible but did not enter: Ian Baker-Finch, Mark Calcavecchia, Nick Faldo, Justin Leonard, Nick Price, Tiger Woods.
Ben Curtis withdrew before the tournament.

2. The Open Champions for 2007–2016

3. Top 10 finishers and ties in the 2016 Open Championship

Sergio García (4,5,9,17)
Bill Haas (4)
Tyrrell Hatton (4,5)
J. B. Holmes (4,12,17)
Dustin Johnson (4,8,12,17)
Andrew Johnston (5)
Søren Kjeldsen (5)
Steve Stricker

4. Top 50 players in the Official World Golf Ranking (OWGR) for Week 21, 2017

Daniel Berger (12)
Wesley Bryan
Rafa Cabrera-Bello (5,17)
Paul Casey (12)
Kevin Chappell (12)
Jason Day (10,11,12)
Ross Fisher (5)
Matt Fitzpatrick (5,17)
Tommy Fleetwood
Rickie Fowler (11,17)
Branden Grace (5)
Emiliano Grillo (12)
Adam Hadwin
Billy Horschel
Kim Si-woo (11,12)
Kevin Kisner (12)
Russell Knox (12)
Brooks Koepka (8,17)
Matt Kuchar (12,17)
Marc Leishman
Hideki Matsuyama (12,21)
William McGirt (12)
Francesco Molinari (5)
Ryan Moore (12,17)
Alex Norén (5,6)
Pat Perez
Thomas Pieters (5,17)
Jon Rahm
Patrick Reed (12,17)
Justin Rose (8,14,17)
Charl Schwartzel (5,12)
Adam Scott (9,12)
Jordan Spieth (8,9,12,17)
Hideto Tanihara (22)
Justin Thomas (12)
Jimmy Walker (10,12,17)
Bubba Watson (9,12)
Bernd Wiesberger (5)
Danny Willett (5,9,17)
Gary Woodland (12)

Brandt Snedeker (12,17) did not play.

5. Top 30 on the 2016 Race to Dubai

Richard Bland
Scott Hend (18)
David Horsey
Thongchai Jaidee
Martin Kaymer (8,17)
Li Haotong
Shane Lowry
Joost Luiten
Thorbjørn Olesen
Andy Sullivan (17)
Wang Jeung-hun
Lee Westwood (17)
Chris Wood (6,17)

6. Last three BMW PGA Championship winners

An Byeong-hun

7. Top 5 players, not already exempt, within the top 20 of the 2017 Race to Dubai through the BMW International Open

Dylan Frittelli
Pablo Larrazábal
Alexander Lévy
David Lipsky
Fabrizio Zanotti

8. Last five U.S. Open winners

9. Last five Masters Tournament winners

10. Last five PGA Championship winners

Jason Dufner (12)

11. Last three Players Championship winners

12. The 30 qualifiers for the 2016 Tour Championship

Roberto Castro
Kevin Na
Sean O'Hair
Jhonattan Vegas

13. Top 5 players, not already exempt, within the top 20 of the 2017 FedEx Cup points list through the Travelers Championship

Brian Harman
Russell Henley
Charley Hoffman
Brendan Steele

14. Winner of the 2016 Olympic Golf Tournament

15. Winner of the 2016 Open de Argentina

Kent Bulle

16. Winner and runner-up from the 2017 Korea Open

Chang Yi-keun
Kim Gi-whan

17. Playing members of the 2016 Ryder Cup teams

18. Winner of the 2016 Asian Tour Order of Merit

19. Winner of the 2016 PGA Tour of Australasia Order of Merit

Matthew Griffin

20. Winner of the 2016–17 Sunshine Tour Order of Merit

Brandon Stone

21. Winner of the 2016 Japan Open

22. Top 2 on the 2016 Japan Golf Tour Official Money List

Yuta Ikeda

23. Top 2, not already exempt, on the 2017 Japan Golf Tour Official Money List through the Japan Golf Tour Championship

Yūsaku Miyazato
Shaun Norris

24. Winner of the 2016 Senior Open Championship

Paul Broadhurst

25. Winner of the 2017 Amateur Championship

Harry Ellis (a)

26. Winner of the 2016 U.S. Amateur
Curtis Luck forfeited his exemption after turning professional in April 2017.

27. Winners of the 2016 and 2017 editions of the European Amateur

Luca Cianchetti (a)
Alfie Plant (a)

28. Recipient of the 2016 Mark H. McCormack Medal

Maverick McNealy (a)

Open Qualifying Series
The Open Qualifying Series (OQS) consisted of 10 events from the six major tours. Places were available to the leading players (not otherwise exempt) who finished in the top n and ties. In the event of ties, positions went to players ranked highest according to that week's OWGR.

Final Qualifying
The Final Qualifying events were played on 4 July at five courses covering Scotland and the North-West, Central and South-coast regions of England. Three qualifying places were available at each location.

Alternates
To make up the full field of 156, additional places were allocated in ranking order from the Official World Golf Ranking at the time that these places were made available by the Championship Committee.

From the Week 26 (week ending 2 July) Official World Golf Ranking:

Webb Simpson (ranked 61)
Anirban Lahiri (66)

From the Week 27 (week ending 9 July) Official World Golf Ranking:

Tony Finau (64)
James Hahn (66)

Round summaries

First round
Thursday, 20 July 2017

Three Americans – Brooks Koepka, Matt Kuchar, and Jordan Spieth – shared the lead after the first round on five under par, a shot clear of England's Paul Casey and Charl Schwartzel, with Ian Poulter a further shot back. Reigning champion Henrik Stenson was one under after a 69. Rory McIlroy was five over par after six holes but recovered to finish with a one-over-par 71.

Second round
Friday, 21 July 2017

In difficult conditions, Jordan Spieth followed his first round 65 with a 69 to lead by two strokes from Matt Kuchar. Only eight players scored under par for their second rounds, Zach Johnson's 66 being the best round of the day. Alfie Plant was the only amateur to make the cut. He eagled the par-five 15th on his way to a 73 and a 36-hole total of 144.

Amateurs: Plant (+4), Syme (+9), Cianchetti (+11), Ellis (+12), McNealy (+12)

Third round
Saturday, 22 July 2017

Jordan Spieth shot a 65 to take a three-stroke lead over Matt Kuchar, who shot a 66. On an easier day of scoring, Branden Grace scored 62, breaking the long-standing men's major championship record of 63. There were also low rounds from Dustin Johnson, with a 64, and Henrik Stenson, with a 65, both getting into a tie for 7th place.

Grace scorecard

{|class="wikitable" span = 50 style="font-size:85%;
|-
|  style="background:Pink; width:10px;"|
|Birdie
|}

Final round
Sunday, 23 July 2017

Beginning the round with a three-shot lead, Jordan Spieth bogeyed three of his first four holes to fall into a tie with Matt Kuchar. A birdie at the 5th combined with a bogey by Kuchar at the 6th allowed Spieth to re-open a two-stroke advantage, but a bogey-birdie swing at the 9th evened the score heading to the back-nine. The score remained level until the 13th, when Spieth hit his tee shot well to the right of the fairway. Forced to take an unplayable lie and drop from the practice area, he managed to get up-and-down to save bogey while Kuchar took the lead by making par. At the par-3 14th, however, Spieth nearly holed his tee shot and converted the birdie attempt to tie Kuchar. Then at the par-5 15th, Spieth made a  eagle putt to take the lead once again. With birdies on the next two holes Spieth played 14–17 in five-under to take a two-stroke lead heading to the last. When Kuchar found a greenside bunker and made bogey, Spieth was able to tap in for par and win the championship by three strokes. Li Haotong birdied his last four holes for 63 (−7) and jump into third place at 274 (−6), the best finish for an Asian player at the Open Championship since Lu Liang-Huan in 1971, also at Royal Birkdale. With the victory, Spieth joined Jack Nicklaus as the only golfers to win three legs of the career Grand Slam before the age of 24.

Final leaderboard

Note: Top 10 and ties qualify for the 2018 Open Championship; top 4 and ties qualify for the 2018 Masters Tournament

Scorecard
Final round

Cumulative tournament scores, relative to par
{|class="wikitable" span = 50 style="font-size:85%;
|-

|style="background: Red;" width=10|
|Eagle
|style="background: Pink;" width=10|
|Birdie
|style="background: PaleGreen;" width=10|
|Bogey
|}
Source:

Notes

References

External links
Royal Birkdale 2017 (Official site)
Coverage on the European Tour's official site
Coverage on the PGA Tour's official site
Coverage on the PGA of America's official site

The Open Championship
Golf tournaments in England
Open Championship
Open Championship
Open Championship